Cindery Island is at the mouth of Brightlingsea Creek (off the town of Brightlingsea) on the east coast of England in the county of Essex.

External links 

Islands of Essex
Brightlingsea